Old soldiers never die is an English language catchphrase.

Old Soldiers Never Die may also refer to:

Old Soldiers Never Die, a 1931 British comedy film
Old Soldiers Never Die, a 1933 memoir of Francis Philip Woodruff
Old Soldiers Never Die, a 1951 single by Vaughn Monroe
The "Old Soldiers Never Die" speech, the farewell address to the U.S. Congress of  general Douglas MacArthur
Old Soldiers Never Die: The Life of Douglas MacArthur, a 1996 book by Geoffrey Perret
Old Soldiers Never Die, a 1973 record by Heads Hands & Feet
Old Soldiers Never Die, a 1969 installation of sitcom Never Mind the Quality, Feel the Width